Eigil Olaf Liane (7 May 1916 – 17 June 1994) was a Norwegian politician for the Labour Party.

He was born in Tinn.

He was elected to the Norwegian Parliament from Telemark in 1954, and was re-elected on four occasions.

Liane was mayor of Sannidal municipality in 1945–1947, 1947–1951 and 1951–1955.

References

1916 births
1994 deaths
Labour Party (Norway) politicians
Members of the Storting
20th-century Norwegian politicians
People from Tinn